Tehila, also spelled Tehilla or Tehillah ( or ), is a Hebrew feminine name meaning "glory" or "praise".

People with the name
Tehilla Blad (born 1995), Swedish actress, singer, swimmer and ballet dancer
Tehila Hakimi (born 1982), Israeli poet and author
Tehila Friedman (born 1976), Israeli lawyer and politician
Tehilla Lichtenstein (1893–1973), co-founder and leader of Jewish Science

See also
Tehila (disambiguation)

References

External links
 Tehila, Name Meaning
 Think Baby Names
 Kveller, Jewish Baby Names

Jewish feminine given names